Sordariomycetidae is a subclass of sac fungi.

Generally, species within the Sordariomycetidae subclass have light-dark coloured perithecia (flask shaped structures opening by a pore). The asci are non-amyloid, or lack apical rings. True paraphyses are normally present in most species.

Three new genera were created within the Sordariomycetidae subclass based on morphological and molecular data (SSU and LSU nrDNA) to hold five ascomycete fungi species collected from submerged woody debris in freshwater habitats from Costa Rica. 

In 2015, after a study that found several genera of fungi taxa were phylogenetically and morphologically distinct from genera in Sordariomycetidae.
So the subclass Diaporthomycetidae was formed for those different that were already placed within Sordariomycetidae subclass.

Wijayawardene et al. in 2020 added more families and genera to the order.

Incertae sedis
Familiae

Amplistromataceae
Annulatascaceae
Apiosporaceae
Batistiaceae
Catabotrydaceae
Cephalothecaceae
Helminthosphaeriaceae
Jobellisiaceae
Papulosaceae
Reticulascaceae
Thyridiaceae

Genera

Ascotaiwania
Ascovaginospora
Biconiosporella
Carpoligna
Caudatispora
Ceratosphaeria
Conioscyphascus
Garethjonesia
Lasiosphaeriella
Lasiosphaeris
Leptosporella
Linocarpon
Merugia
Mycomedusiospora
Myelosperma
Neolinocarpon
Phaeotrichosphaeria
Phragmodiscus
Plagiosphaera
Spinulosphaeria
Wallrothiella

References

Sordariomycetes
Fungus subclasses
Lichen subclasses
Taxa described in 1997